Graeme Hedley (born 1 March 1957) is an English former footballer who made 107 appearances in the Football League playing as a midfielder for Middlesbrough, Sheffield Wednesday, Darlington, York City and Hartlepool United. He also played in Hong Kong for Ryoden and in English non-league football for Horden Colliery Welfare and Whitby Town. After retiring as a player, he worked in insurance and later assisted wife Pauline with running the post office at Wolviston, County Durham. He managed Northern League club Easington Colliery in the early 2000s.

References

1957 births
Living people
Sportspeople from Easington, County Durham
Footballers from County Durham
English footballers
Association football midfielders
Middlesbrough F.C. players
Sheffield Wednesday F.C. players
Darlington F.C. players
York City F.C. players
Darlington Town F.C. players
Hartlepool United F.C. players
Whitby Town F.C. players
English Football League players
English football managers
Easington Colliery A.F.C. managers
Ryoden players